The Alta A200 was a three-wheel passenger car introduced in 1968, produced by  Alta, a Greek vehicle manufacturer. The car was largely based on the German Fuldamobil (licence produced in Greece by Attica), but it was an altogether more modern design. Powered by a Heinkel 200 cc engine, the car had modest success in the Greek market and was soon considered outdated. Produced until 1974, it is often cited as the last derivative of the Fuldamobil and is seen by many as a collectible item.

References 
 L.S. Skartsis and G.A. Avramidis, "Made in Greece", Typorama, Patras, Greece (2003).
 G.N. Georgano (Ed.), "The New Encyclopedia of Motorcars, 1885 to Present", E.P. Dutton, New York (1982).
 M. Sedgwick, "Cars of the Fifties and Sixties", Crescent Books (1990).
 Automobil Revue/Revue Automobile (1971 ed.)

External links 
A perfectly restored Alta A200 in a museum in Eggenburg, Austria

Cars of Greece
Microcars
Cars introduced in 1968